Tim Fahrenholz (born 22 March 1994) is a German footballer who plays as a midfielder for FC Astoria Walldorf.

References

External links
 

1994 births
Living people
German footballers
1. FSV Mainz 05 II players
Karlsruher SC players
Karlsruher SC II players
FC Astoria Walldorf players
Association football midfielders
3. Liga players
2. Bundesliga players
Regionalliga players
Oberliga (football) players
Sportspeople from Darmstadt